The 2022 Canadian University Field Lacrosse Association season was the 37th in the history of the CUFLA. The regular season took place from September 7 through October 23. The first round of playoffs were held on the weekend of October 28–30, and the league championship, the Baggataway Cup, was held at Trent University on the weekend of November 4–7.

Regular season
Reference:

Playoff weekend
Winners of each first round game advance to either quarter- or semi-finals, based on seed.

Baggataway Cup
Reference:

References

Lacrosse
Lacrosse competitions in Canada